The Charlie Brown and Franz Stigler incident occurred on 20 December 1943, when, after a successful bomb run on Bremen, 2nd Lt. Charles "Charlie" Brown's B-17F Flying Fortress Ye Olde Pub of the United States Army Air Forces (USAAF) was severely damaged by German fighters. Luftwaffe pilot Franz Stigler had the opportunity to shoot down the crippled bomber but did not do so, and instead escorted it over and past German-occupied territory so as to protect it. After an extensive search by Brown, the two pilots met each other 50 years later and developed a friendship that lasted until Stigler's death in March 2008. Brown died only a few months later, in November of the same year.

Pilots 
Charles Lester Brown (24 October 1922 – 24 November 2008) was a B-17 pilot with the 527th Bombardment Squadron of the 379th Bombardment Group within the USAAF's VIII Bomber Command, stationed at RAF Kimbolton in England. Brown was from Weston, West Virginia.

Franz Stigler (21 August 1915 – 22 March 2008) was a veteran Luftwaffe fighter pilot attached to Jagdgeschwader 27. Stigler was from Regensburg, Bavaria.

Bremen mission 
The mission of 20 December 1943 was the Ye Olde Pub crew's first and targeted the Focke-Wulf 190 aircraft production facility in Bremen. The men of the 527th BS were informed in a pre-mission briefing that they might encounter hundreds of German fighters. Bremen was guarded by more than 250 flak guns. Brown's crew was assigned to fly "Purple Heart Corner," a spot on the edge of the formation that was considered especially dangerous because the Germans targeted the edges, instead of shooting straight through the middle of the formation. However, since three bombers had to turn back because of mechanical problems, Brown was told to move up to the front of the formation.

For this mission, the crew of Ye Olde Pub (B-17F serial number 42-3167) consisted of:

 2nd Lt. Charles L. "Charlie" Brown (24 October 1922 – 24 November 2008): pilot / aircraft commander
 2nd Lt. Spencer G. "Pinky" Luke (22 November 1920 – 2 April 1985): co-pilot
 2nd Lt. Albert A. "Doc" Sadok (23 August 1921 – 10 March 2010): navigator
 2nd Lt. Robert M. "Andy" Andrews (14 January 1921 – 23 February 1996): radio operator & bombardier
 Sgt. Bertrand O. "Frenchy" Coulombe (1 March 1924 – 25 March 2006): top turret gunner and flight engineer
 Sgt. Richard A. "Dick" Pechout (14 September 1924 – 5 January 2013): radio operator
 Sgt. Hugh S. "Ecky" Eckenrode (9 August 1920 – 20 December 1943): tail gunner
 Sgt. Lloyd H. Jennings (22 February 1922 – 3 October 2016): left waist gunner
 Sgt. Alex "Russian" Yelesanko (31 January 1914 – 25 May 1980): right waist gunner
 Sgt. Samuel W. "Blackie" Blackford (26 October 1923 – 16 June 2001): ball turret gunner

Bomb run 
Before the bomber released its bomb load, accurate flak shattered the Plexiglas nose, knocked out the #2 engine and further damaged the #4 engine, which was already in questionable condition and had to be throttled back to prevent overspeeding. As the damage had slowed the bomber, Brown was unable to remain with his formation and fell back as a straggler, a position in which he came under sustained enemy attacks.

Fighter attacks 
Brown's struggling B-17 was now attacked by over a dozen enemy fighters (a combination of Messerschmitt Bf 109s and Focke-Wulf Fw 190s) of JG 11 for more than ten minutes. Further damage was sustained, including to the #3 engine, reducing it to only half power (meaning the aircraft had effectively, at best, 40% of its total rated power available). The bomber's internal oxygen, hydraulic, and electrical systems were also damaged, and the bomber had lost half of its rudder and port (left side) elevator, as well as its nose cone. Several of the gunners' weapons had jammed, most likely as a result of the loss of on-board systems, leading to frozen firing mechanisms. This left the bomber with only two dorsal turret guns plus one of the three forward-firing nose guns (from 11 available) for defense. Many of the crew were wounded: the tail gunner, Eckenrode, had been decapitated by a direct hit from a cannon shell, while Yelesanko was critically wounded in the leg by shrapnel, Blackford's feet were frozen due to shorted-out heating wires in his uniform, Pechout had been hit in the eye by a cannon shell and Brown was wounded in his right shoulder. The morphine syrettes carried onboard had also frozen, complicating first-aid efforts by the crew, while the radio was destroyed and the bomber's exterior heavily damaged. Miraculously, all but Eckenrode survived. The crew discussed the possibility of bailing out of the aircraft, but realized Yelesanko would be unable to make a safe landing with his injury. Unwilling to leave him behind in the plane, they flew on.

Franz Stigler 

Brown's damaged, straggling bomber was spotted by Germans on the ground, including Franz Stigler (then an ace with 27 victories), who was refueling and rearming at an airfield. He soon took off in his Messerschmitt Bf 109 G-6 (which had a .50-cal. M2 Browning machine gun bullet embedded in its radiator, risking the engine overheating) and quickly caught up with Brown's plane. Through openings torn in the damaged bomber's airframe by flak and machine gun fire, Stigler was able to see the injured and incapacitated crew. To the American pilot's surprise, the German did not open fire on the crippled bomber. Stigler instead recalled the words of one of his commanding officers from JG 27, Gustav Rödel, during his time fighting in North Africa: "If I ever see or hear of you shooting at a man in a parachute, I will shoot you myself." Stigler later commented, "To me, it was just like they were in a parachute. I saw them and I couldn't shoot them down."

Twice Stigler tried to persuade Brown to land his plane at a German airfield and surrender, or divert to nearby neutral Sweden, where he and his crew would receive medical treatment and be interned for the remainder of the war. However Brown and the crew of the B-17 did not understand what Stigler was trying to mouth and gesture to them, and so flew on. Stigler later told Brown he was trying to get them to fly to Sweden. He then flew near Brown's plane in close formation on the bomber's port side wing, so that German anti-aircraft units would not target it, and escorted the damaged B-17 across the coast until they reached open water. Brown, still unsure of Stigler's intentions, ordered his dorsal turret gunner to target his guns on Stigler but not open fire, to warn him off. Understanding the message and certain that the bomber was finally out of German airspace, Stigler departed with a salute.

Landing 
He was told not to repeat this to the rest of the unit so as not to build any positive sentiment about enemy pilots, lest other damaged bombers hold their fire on incoming fighter planes hoping to be rescued, only to be shot down. Brown commented, "Someone decided you can't be human and be flying in a German cockpit." Stigler said nothing of the incident to his commanding officers, knowing that a German pilot who spared the enemy while in combat risked a court-martial.

Brown went on to complete a combat tour. Stigler later served as a Messerschmitt Me 262 jet-fighter pilot in Jagdverband 44 until the end of the war. Ye Olde Pub did not return to combat; it was returned to the U.S. in April 1944 and was scrapped in August 1945.

Postwar 
After the war, Brown returned home to West Virginia and went to college, returning to the newly established U.S. Air Force in 1949 and serving until 1965. Later, as a U.S. State Department Foreign Service Officer, he made numerous trips to Laos and Vietnam. In 1972, he retired from government service and moved to Miami, Florida, to become an inventor.

Stigler moved to Canada in 1953 and became a successful businessman.

Meeting of pilots
In 1986, the retired Lt. Col. Brown was asked to speak at a combat pilot reunion event called a "Gathering of the Eagles" at the Air Command and Staff College at Maxwell Air Force Base, Alabama. Someone asked him if he had any memorable missions during World War II; he thought for a minute and recalled the story of the Bf 109 escort and pilot's salute. Afterwards, Brown decided he should try to find the unknown German pilot.

After four years of searching vainly for U.S. Army Air Forces, U.S. Air Force and West German air force records that might shed some light on who the other pilot was, Brown had come up with little. He then wrote a letter to a combat pilot association newsletter. A few months later he received a letter from Stigler, who was now living in Canada. "I was the one," it said. When they spoke on the phone, Stigler described his plane, the escort and salute, confirming everything that Brown needed to hear to know he was the German fighter pilot involved in the incident.

Between 1990 and 2008, Charlie Brown and Franz Stigler became close friends and remained so until their deaths within several months of each other in 2008.

Legacy
In 1993, Stigler was presented with the "Star of Peace" by the Combatants Federation of Europe.

In 2008, following a request from pilot Brown, crew members of the B-17 were each awarded the Silver Star; Brown himself was awarded the Air Force Cross.

The incident was the subject of a biographical novel by Adam Makos, A Higher Call, released in 2012.

For their 2014 Heroes album, Swedish heavy metal band Sabaton wrote a song about the incident titled "No Bullets Fly".

In January 2019, a surviving B-17 (serial number 44-8543) operated by Erickson Aircraft Collection of Madras, Oregon, was repainted as Ye Olde Pub. The plane is flown in airshows and to provide historic flight experiences.

Lloyd Jennings, a waist gunner on the B-17, was the last surviving crew member of the incident; he died in 2016.

Sources

References

Further reading

External links 
 
  (9 April 2022)
  by Sabaton

World War II aerial operations and battles of the Western European Theatre
1943 in Germany
Aviation accidents and incidents in 1943
Military history of Huntingdonshire